Cranfillia is a genus of ferns in the family Blechnaceae, subfamily Blechnoideae, according to the Pteridophyte Phylogeny Group classification of 2016 (PPG I). The genus is accepted in a 2016 classification of the family Blechnaceae, but other sources sink it into a very broadly defined Blechnum, equivalent to the whole of the PPG I subfamily.

Species
, using the PPG I classification system, the Checklist of Ferns and Lycophytes of the World accepted the following species:

Cranfillia caudata (Baker) V.A.O.Dittrich & Gasper
Cranfillia fluviatilis (R.Br.) Gasper & V.A.O.Dittrich
Cranfillia fullagari (T.C.Chambers & P.A.Farrant) Gasper & V.A.O.Dittrich
Cranfillia geniculata (T.C.Chambers & P.A.Farrant) Gasper & V.A.O.Dittrich
Cranfillia glabrescens (T.C.Chambers & Sykes) Gasper & V.A.O.Dittrich
Cranfillia hirsuta (Rosenst.) Gasper & V.A.O.Dittrich
Cranfillia longicauda (C.Chr.) Gasper & V.A.O.Dittrich
Cranfillia mucronata (Fée) V.A.O.Dittrich & Gasper
Cranfillia nigra (Colenso) Gasper & V.A.O.Dittrich
Cranfillia opaca (Mett.) Gasper & V.A.O.Dittrich
Cranfillia pilosa (Brack.) Gasper & V.A.O.Dittrich
Cranfillia sampaioana (Brade) Gasper & V.A.O.Dittrich
Cranfillia vulcanica (Blume) Gasper & V.A.O.Dittrich

References

Blechnaceae
Fern genera